John Krebs (born October 1, 1950 - March 16, 2023) was an American professional stock car racing driver. Hailing from Roseville, California, he was a 15-year veteran of NASCAR's Cup Series, competing in 19 events from 1978 to 1994. He also competed in the Winston West Series for many years, scoring one win in the series in 1978.

Krebs was involved in an accident with Derrike Cope at Sears Point Raceway in 1994 that sent Krebs flipping outside of the racetrack's limits. It was the final race of Krebs' Cup Series career as he failed to qualify for races at Indianapolis and Phoenix later that season.

Later on Krebs owned a team in the NASCAR K&N Pro Series West. The team, John Krebs Racing, competed in their last race in 2018 with driver Takuma Koga. The team's best finish came at Orange Show Speedway in 2017, where they placed fifth.

Motorsports career results

NASCAR
(key) (Bold – Pole position awarded by qualifying time. Italics – Pole position earned by points standings or practice time. * – Most laps led.)

Winston Cup Series

ARCA Hooters SuperCar Series
(key) (Bold – Pole position awarded by qualifying time. Italics – Pole position earned by points standings or practice time. * – Most laps led.)

References

External links
 
 

1950 births
Racing drivers from California
NASCAR drivers
NASCAR team owners
Living people
ARCA Menards Series drivers
Sportspeople from Roseville, California